Karl-Preis-Platz is a Munich U-Bahn station on line U2. Since 12. December 2011 it is also used by the booster line U7 in the morning.

The station is situated below Claudius-Keller-Straße in the borough of Ramersdorf. 
The walls are covered by grey-beige-colored panels, the floor is paved with artificial gravels that resemble gravels from the river Isar. The pillars are covered by grey-beige-colored tiles. The ceiling has rows of neon tubes and is faced with aluminium lamellae.
At the western end you can get to the surface using a ramp. At the eastern end you use stairs to get to a mezzanine. From there you can reach the junction Claudius-Keller-Straße/Rosenheimer Straße.

The station was named after the Karl-Preis-Platz which was named after Karl Sebastian Preis (SPD), town councilor in Munich and founder of the local building society GEWOFAG.

Stations

References

External links 
 More information

Munich U-Bahn stations
Railway stations in Germany opened in 1980
1980 establishments in West Germany